Jan Wulff Laugesen (born 23 October 1964) is a Danish handball coach. He coached the Greenlandic women's national team at the 2001 World Women's Handball Championship.

References

Weblinks 
 Jan Laugesen at DHDb-projektet
 Jan Laugesen at LinkedIn

1964 births
Living people
Danish handball coaches
Handball coaches of international teams